Martin Morris may refer to:

 Martin Ferdinand Morris (1834–1909), American lawyer
 Martin Morris, 2nd Baron Killanin (1867–1927), Irish Conservative Member of Parliament